Starlite & Campbell is a group based in Portugal. Formed in 2016, the band is led by married couple Suzy Starlite and Simon Campbell. Their debut album, Blueberry Pie was nominated for a European Blues Award in November 2017 and blends British blues, British rock, blues and British folk.

In 2023, following the transition album ‘’The Language of Curiosity’’ they decided to change musical direction and launched the multimedia, Art Rock project Starlite.One. Simultaneously, the band name was changed from the Starlite Campbell Band to Starlite & Campbell reflecting the new direction.

History
The duo had been recording, playing and touring independently in bands for many years until they met in 2012, when Starlite asked Campbell, who was British Blues Awards Nominee, to join her band as the guitar player. The love extended past each other's playing and the duo were wed in 2014 after a whirlwind romance, forming their new joint band, Starlite Campbell, in January 2016.

As prolific singer-songwriters, they started writing together immediately and built up a large collection of songs in a variety of styles, from Americana, folk music, electronic music, progressive rock to British blues. The art of the song is everything and they fly in the face of disposable music – writing, recording and producing their work and then releasing on their independent label Supertone Records.

Their first recorded collaboration was on Campbell's second solo album, The Knife where they jointly wrote and performed Do You Want Me with Campbell on acoustic guitar, Theremin and vocals and Starlite on Mellotron and vocals.

Recordings

Blueberry Pie
The couple wrote the material for their debut album Blueberry Pie over two weeks in April 2016 and started recording in July at the Supertone Records Studio in Valencia, Spain, with the album mixed and mastered in October 2016. It was produced and engineered by Campbell, co-produced by Starlite and mastered by Jon Astley who is known for his work with The Who and other rock luminaries. In addition to the band and session musicians Steve Gibson and Jonny Henderson, Valencian native Danny Boy Sanchez was co opted to play harmonica on track No. 5, "Say What You Want".

The album artwork is based on a picture taken by Starlite in the late 70's of her Grandmother Betty Higgs.

Blueberry Pie was released on 1 February 2017 and has been extensively reviewed by publications in the UK, Europe, USA and Australia Blues Matters!, R2 (Rock'n'Reel), Classic Rock

The band made a festive release It Started Raining on 24 December 2017. The song was recorded live at Supertone Records studio in Valencia, Spain as part of the 'Blueberry Pie' sessions with a single guitar overdub. The cover image was taken by Isle of Man-based photographer Phil Kneen and features an old caravan featured in the song's lyric.

On 12 November 2018 the band simultaneously released their new single Heart of Stone along with a limited edition, gatefold, 180g double phonograph record (vinyl) of their album Blueberry Pie. The lacquers were cut by Miles Showell at Abbey Road Studios and the pressing supported by the Isle of Man Arts Council.

Recorded as part of the original Blueberry Pie sessions, the track has a stinging, acidic lyric that complements the track's hypnotic rolling groove. It appears exclusively in physical form on side four of the record. The cover image was taken by Isle of Man-based photographer Phil Kneen featuring actor Rob Smith.

The Language of Curiosity
In May 2019 Starlite and Campbell relocated their Supertone Records studio into the countryside near Hanover, Germany, where they started recording their second British blues / British rock music album, The Language of Curiosity moving again in October 2020 to Lisbon, Portugal where they continue work on the recordings. Five singles have been released from the album which was made its debut on November 5, 2021 and has been extensively reviewed by publications in the UK, Europe, USA and Australia including Blues Matters!, R2 (Rock'n'Reel), Classic Rock

Again, it is produced and engineered by Campbell, co-produced by Starlite and mastered by Astley. In addition to the band and session musicians Steve Gibson (drums), Gabriele De Vecchio (Grand / upright Piano, Wurlitzer and Hammond organ) and Jonny Henderson (Hammond Organ, Wurlitzer Electric piano, Vox Continental, Hohner Clavinet and Bechstein grand piano). Some of Henderson's keyboard parts were recorded at Rockfield Studios in Monmouth, Wales. The cover photograph was taken by award-winning photographer Stuart Bebb depicting dancing in the streets of Oxford following the relaxation of the COVID-19 restrictions in the United Kingdom.

Starlite Campbell Band Live!
During the course of the band's career, several live recordings were made and in 2022 eight tracks were mixed and released digitally and on Compact Disc. The album features highly improvised and extended versions of tracks from Campbell's solo album ThirtySixplus the bands Language of Curiosity, Blueberry Pie and  Procol Harum's A Whiter Shade Of Pale which was released as a single in June 2022. The album has attracted excellent reviews.

The band digitally released the accompanying album Starlite Campbell Band Live! 2 in October 2022.

Starlite.One - the album
The couple are currently recording an experimental Art Rock album Starlite.One, which will fuse electronic elements with traditional acoustic instrumentation. The album is set for release in October 2023 under the Starlite.One banner.

Live performances
British blues trio / quartet
During 2017 and 2018, the band performed extensively throughout Spain and the Isle of Man; in July 2018 band played Linton Festival to great reviews.

Accompanied by drummer Steve Gibson, the band traveled to Australia to headline the blues marquee at Wangaratta Festival of Jazz on Saturday 3 November 2018 to over 3000 people with great reviews and extensive publicity. Accompanying the band on this show was Australian keyboard player Clayton Doley.

The Starlite Campbell Band embarked on their debut tour of the United Kingdom in December 2018 with performances in Coulsdon, Pershore, Edinburgh, Eaglescliffe, Saltburn-by-the-Sea and The Met (arts centre) in Campbell's hometown of Bury, Greater Manchester to great reviews.

2019 has seen them touring Europe and the United Kingdom which included a show at one of London's longest-running and most respected live music venues, The Half Moon, Putney plus the Forum, Darlington, The Met (arts centre), Bury, Greater Manchester - which featured Josh Phillips (musician) of Procol Harum on keyboards - Flirting With The Blues festival, Amersfoort, Porgy en Bess, Terneuzen and the Greystones, Sheffield.

In 2020 the band performed at The Great British Rock and Blues Festival (main stage), Skegness; Backstage at the Green, Kinross; Redcar R&B Club and the Half Moon, Putney amongst others. Due to the COVID-19 pandemic, much of 2021 was rescheduled to 2022/2023.

Duo
Starlite & Campbell tour material from the band's first two albums, Campbell's ThirtySix and The Knife plus their upcoming album The Coat in venues throughout the UK and Europe to great reviews.

Between December 2021 and July 2022, Starlite & Campbell broadcast a weekly live stream on YouTube, Twitter, Twitch and Facebook from the Supertone studio in Portugal.

Members
 Suzy Starlite: Lead and backing vocals, bass guitar, piano, mellotron, stylophone, Mandolin, fife, percussion, Moog Taurus bass pedals, Philicorda and recorder (2016–present)
 Simon Campbell: Lead and backing vocals, electric guitar, resonator guitar, Moog guitar, acoustic guitar, theremin, Sequential Tempest drum machine, percussion and piano (2016–present)

Session musicians
The band use a variety of fine musicians both live and in the studio depending upon suitability for the project, availability and geographical location.
 
 Josh Phillips: Hammond organ, Wurlitzer electric piano (2019-2020)
 Govert Van Der Kolm: Hammond organ, Wurlitzer electric piano (2019)
 Jonny Henderson: Hammond organ, Wurlitzer electric piano, Piano (2016–present)
 Clayton Doley: Hammond organ, Wurlitzer electric piano (2018)
 Christian Madden: Hammond organ, Wurlitzer electric piano (2016–present)
 Gabriele Del Vecchio: Hammond organ, Wurlitzer electric piano, Piano (2017–present)
 Steve Gibson: Drum kit (2016–present)
 Hugo Danin: Drum kit (2023–present)

Equipment
Both Starlite and Campbell are users of vintage equipment, specifically valve amplifiers for guitar and bass and use multiple brands including vintage Hiwatt, Gartone, Germino, Vox, Matamp, Supertone, Ampeg and Van Weelden with speakers by Electro-Voice, Celestion and Bergantino Audio Systems.

Starlite favours instruments by Mike Lull, Gretsch, Fender Musical Instruments Corporation and Fylde Guitars some fitted with the Hipshot drop-D tuners. She was featured with a two-page article in Bass Guitar talking her equipment and playing style.

Campbell's instruments include Gibson, Moog synthesizer, Moog Guitar E1-M, Mosrite, Fender Musical Instruments Corporation, Collings Guitars, National Reso-Phonic Guitars, Guild Guitar Company, Duesenberg Guitars, Fylde Guitars Fallstaff six, 12 and Classical models all with cutaways, plus signature models by luthier Jim Drake in Colorado and Gordon Whittam (Gordy) in Manchester, UK with pickups by Lollar, Sheptone, Lindy Fralin and House of Tone. He is known for his expertise and extensive use of the Maestro Echoplex EP2 tape echo.

They use bass/guitar strings principally by Curt Mangan, Thomastik-Infeld and Pyramid with Effects unit's by Lehle, DWJ Pedals, Supertone, Ernie Ball, Hudson Electronics, TC Electronic, Eventide, Lexicon, Chase Tone, Headway, Sonic Research, LovePedal, Skrydstrup R&D, Textone, Digitech, Voodoo Labs, GigRig, Origin Effects, CMAT Mods, Headway Music Audio, Gamechanger Audio, Strymon, B. K. Butler, Stomp Under Foot, Danelectro, T-Rex, Pro Co RAT, Ceriatone and Fulltone.

Synthesisers: Matriarch, Minitaur and Opus 3 by Moog synthesizer, STVC by Waldorf Music, Tempest and Prophet-5 by Sequential.

Side projects
 Starlite.One 
In August 2022 Starlite & Campbell announced the development of a multimedia project, Starlite.One. It is musically explorative whilst keeping the narratives of melody, emotion, soundscapes and lyrical story-telling alive. The music binds conceptual, applied and visual art which is represented physically and digitally.

 The Supertone Show 
From November 2015 to October 2019 Starlite and Campbell broadcast the Supertone Show'', a weekly, music-inspired chat show about songs and the people who make them. It featured an eclectic mix of music from their vinyl collections, plus special shows focussing on inspirational people who have influenced and changed the sound of modern music. The show was syndicated to 14 internet and FM stations based in the Netherlands, USA, Canada, and the UK. Repeats are still being broadcast and an archive is available on the Starlite & Campbell website.

The show was resurrected in January 2023 and is available on Spotify and the Starlite & Campbell website.

Electrolite 
In May 2014 the couple, with Mark Cleator, recorded a synth-pop / electronic music, extended play record under the name Electrolite. Writing took place on the Isle of Man and later in Duras, Lot-et-Garonne, France and Valencia, Spain. The EP was released electronically and on 180g vinyl and features Starlite on vocals, Campbell on drum & bass synthesiser programming, MOOG E1 guitar, electric guitar, Theremin, backing vocals with Mark Cleator on an array of analog synthesizers by Moog, ARP, Dave Smith plus an original Mellotron. It was recorded at the Chairworks Studio in Castleford with engineer James Mottershead, produced by Campbell and mastered by Kevin Grainger at Wired Masters, London and in 2017 the record was licensed to Ninthwave Records. The sleeve was designed by Barry Kinder and Daren Newman.

Discography
Studio albums

Live albums

Singles

Awards and nominations

References

External links
Starlite Campbell website
Starlite.One website
Supertone Records website

British blues musical groups
Manx musical groups
2016 establishments in the Isle of Man
Musical groups established in 2016
British blues musicians